Ryan Gamble (born 22 November 1972) is a South African former footballer who played as a forward.

Playing career 
Gamble began his career within the Canadian National Soccer League in 1994 with Toronto Italia, where he led the league in scoring and was named the Rookie of the Year. In 1996, he helped Italia claim the double (regular season title, and CNSL Championship). He featured in the CNSL Championship final against St. Catharines Wolves, and contributed a goal. In 1997, he signed with San Francisco Bay Seals of the USISL D-3 Pro League, where he helped San Francisco win the Western Division. At the conclusion of the USISL season, he signed with the Toronto Lynx of the USL A-League.

In 2001, Gamble signed with Toronto Supra of the Canadian Professional Soccer League. During the season he was selected for the CPSL All-Star roster which faced C.S. Marítimo. In 2005, he signed with expansion franchise Oakville Blue Devils, where he helped Oakville finish second in the Western Conference with the best offensive record in the division. Gamble featured in the CPSL Championship match against Vaughan Shooters, where he came off the bench to score the winning goal to claim the club's first championship. After the championship match, Gamble announced his retirement from competitive soccer.

Administrative career 
In 2019, he was a staff member for the Mississauga MetroStars in the Major Arena Soccer League and was involved in strategy and platform development. He announced the team's partnership with Marvel Comics, which would host the Marvel Super Hero Weekend sporting experience.

Honours

Toronto Italia
Canadian National Soccer League Regular Season Champions: 1996
CNSL Championship: 1996

Oakville Blue Devils
CPSL Championship: 2005

References 

Living people
South African soccer players
Canadian Soccer League (1998–present) players
Brampton United players
SC Toronto players
Toronto Italia players
Toronto Lynx players
A-League (1995–2004) players
USL Second Division players
Soccer people from Ontario
People from Oakville, Ontario
Bay Area Seals players
Canadian National Soccer League players
1972 births
Association football forwards